Albert John Whitehurst (22 June 1898 – 1976) was an English footballer who played in the Football League for Bradford City, Liverpool, Rochdale, Stoke and Tranmere Rovers.

Whitehurst played for five professional clubs during his career and was a prolific scorer, setting club records at two of his clubs, Rochdale for goals in a season and Bradford City for the number of goals in a game.

Playing career
Whitehurst was born in Fenton and started his career at his works football team New Haden Colliery, before moving to Stoke in 1920. He played 11 times in 1920–21 scoring twice and played six matches in 1921–22 again getting on the score sheet twice but he manages just one appearance in 1922–23 and was sold to Rochdale. Whitehurst played five seasons for Rochdale scoring a total of 117 league goals, including a club record 46 goals in 43 games in 1926–27 as the "Dale" agonisingly missed out on promotion.

He moved to Liverpool, where he played just eight times scoring twice, before moving onto Bradford City. Despite starting in just 38 games, he scored 30 goals. He scored twice in both his first games, before scoring seven in his fourth game against Tranmere Rovers on 6 March 1929. He scored another two hat-tricks that season as City earned promotion from Football League Third Division North. His seven goals in one game is a Bradford City record. He left the following season to join his final club Tranmere Rovers where he played in 90 matches scoring 35 goals.

Career statistics
Source:

Honours
 Bradford City
 Football League Third Division North champions: 1928–29

 Stoke
 Football League Second Division runners-up: 1921–22

References

External links
 LFChistory.net profile

1898 births
1976 deaths
Footballers from Stoke-on-Trent
Stoke City F.C. players
Rochdale A.F.C. players
Liverpool F.C. players
Bradford City A.F.C. players
Tranmere Rovers F.C. players
English footballers
English Football League players
Association football forwards